Iodocyanopindolol (INN) is a drug related to pindolol which acts as both a β1 adrenoreceptor antagonist and a 5-HT1A receptor antagonist. Its 125I radiolabelled derivative has been widely used in mapping the distribution of beta adrenoreceptors in the body.

References

5-HT1A antagonists
Beta blockers
Iodoarenes
Indoles
Nitriles
N-tert-butyl-phenoxypropanolamines